Coleman Townsend Robinson (12 January 1838 – 1 May 1872) was an American entomologist who specialised in Lepidoptera.

He wrote Grote, A.R., & Robinson, C.T. 1867–1868. Descriptions of American Lepidoptera – Nos 1–3. 
Transactions of the American Entomological Society 1(1): 1–30; (2): 171–192, pl. 4; (4): 323–360, pl. 6, pl. 7  with Augustus Radcliffe Grote.

References
Skinner, Henry (H.S.). Coleman T. Robinson. Entomological News, Vol. 36 (1925), p. 309. BHL
Coleman Townsend Robinson. Find a Grave. 
Headrick, David; George Gordh (2003). A Dictionary of Entomology. Wallingford, United Kingdom: CABI Publishing, 788. .

American entomologists
1872 deaths
1838 births